Captain Hugh Talbot Burgoyne VC (17 July 1833 – 7 September 1870) was an Irish recipient of the Victoria Cross. Born in Dublin, he was the son of John Fox Burgoyne and the grandson of John Burgoyne.

Burgoyne was a 21-year-old Royal Navy lieutenant, serving in the Crimean War when he performed the deed for which he was awarded the VC.

Details
On 29 May 1855, in the Sea of Azov, Crimea, Lieutenant Burgoyne of HMS Swallow, with Lieutenant Cecil William Buckley from HMS Miranda and Gunner John Robarts from HMS Ardent, volunteered to land at a beach where the Russian army were in strength. They were out of covering gunshot range of the ships offshore and met considerable enemy opposition, but managed to set fire to corn stores and ammunition dumps and destroy enemy equipment before embarking again.

Burgoyne was Commander on HMS Ganges under Captain John Fulford during that vessel's service in the waters of the Colonies of Vancouver Island and British Columbia during the fledgling years of the latter colony's establishment.  "When the American merchant ship Northern Eagle was burned in Esquimalt Harbour, Captain Burgoyne was highly commended for his efforts to save everything possible from the burning ship. Seamen from the Ganges, Pylades, Tribune, and Plumper also assisted."

Later career
Burgoyne later achieved the rank of captain and was killed when in command of HMS Captain, which capsized off Cape Finisterre during a gale on 7 September 1870. This revolutionary masted turret ship had been the subject of considerable controversy during its design and construction and its loss was attributed to its poor stability.

Burgoyne is buried in Brompton Cemetery, London towards the north-east corner.

Legacy
Burgoyne Bay in British Columbia was named after him in 1859.

St. Paul’s Cathedral, London houses a memorial to Burgoyne and the Officers, Marines, Men and Boys who perished off the South African Coast.

References

Listed in order of publication year 
The Register of the Victoria Cross (1981, 1988 and 1997)

Ireland's VCs (Dept of Economic Development 1995)
Monuments to Courage (David Harvey, 1999)
Irish Winners of the Victoria Cross (Richard Doherty & David Truesdale, Four Courts, 2000 )

Royal Navy officers
Irish recipients of the Victoria Cross
Crimean War recipients of the Victoria Cross
Royal Navy personnel of the Crimean War
1833 births
1870 deaths
19th-century Irish people
Heirs apparent who never acceded
Military personnel from Dublin (city)
Burials at Brompton Cemetery
Royal Navy recipients of the Victoria Cross
Irish sailors in the Royal Navy
Captains who went down with the ship